Chitra Shaji Kailas (born Annie Jobbie; 21 July 1975), better known mononymously as Annie, is an Indian actress and television host from Kerala, who appears in Malayalam films and television. Her film career spanned three years from 1993 to 1996 with a total of 16 films in Malayalam cinema, she retired from acting post-marriage and returned as a television host in 2015.

She debuted as an actress in 1993 in the film Ammayane Sathyam directed by Balachandra Menon. She won the Filmfare Award for Best Actress – Malayalam for her role in Mazhayethum Munpe (1995). Her other most noted films include Parvathy Parinayam (1995) directed by P. G. Viswambharan, Rudraksham (1994), Tom & Jerry (1995), Puthukkottayile Puthumanavalan (1995), and Swapna Lokathe Balabhaskaran (1996).

Personal life
She hails from a Christian family in Pala, Kerala, India and raised in Thiruvalla. She was born to Jobbie and Mariamma in 1975. She has three older sisters, Lissy, Mary and Tessy. Her mother died when she was in eighth grade. Though she was from Pala the family was settled at Thiruvananthapuram due to her father's job. She studied at Holy Angel's Convent Higher Secondary School, Thiruvananthapuram and then joined at All Saints College for higher studies and it was during that time she entered in to films.

She is married to Shaji Kailas. She converted to Hinduism three months after her wedding with Shaji Kailas and changed her name to Chitra Shaji Kailas. She has three sons.

Filmography

Films

Television

As voice actor

Awards
1996 - Filmfare Award for Best Actress – Malayalam for Mazhayethum Munpe
2016 - Vayalar Awards - Best Television Host

Controversies
Annie's Kitchen a cookery cum chat show hosted by Annie in Amrita TV have invited lot of criticism over sexist remarks, endorsing patriarchy, stereotyping, conservatism and body shaming. She was subjected to a lot of social media trolls in 2020, following one such talks with Nimisha Sajayan.

References

External links
 

People from Pala, Kerala
Living people
Actresses from Thiruvananthapuram
20th-century Indian actresses
Actresses in Malayalam cinema
Indian film actresses
Indian former Christians
Indian Hindus
1975 births
Converts to Hinduism
Converts to Hinduism from Catholicism